The 1933 Manhattan Jaspers football team was an American football team that represented Manhattan College as an independent during the 1933 college football season.  In its second season under head coach Chick Meehan, the team compiled a 5–3–1 record.

Schedule

References

Manhattan
Manhattan Jaspers football seasons
Manhattan Jaspers football